Helger Hallik (born 26 November 1972) is a former Estonian wrestler who competed in the 1992 Summer Olympics, 1996 Summer Olympics and in the 2000 Summer Olympics.

References

External links
 

1972 births
Living people
Olympic wrestlers of Estonia
Wrestlers at the 1992 Summer Olympics
Wrestlers at the 1996 Summer Olympics
Wrestlers at the 2000 Summer Olympics
Estonian male sport wrestlers
Sportspeople from Tartu